Damn Small Linux (DSL) is a discontinued computer operating system for the x86 family of personal computers. It is free and open-source software under the terms of the GNU GPL and other free and open source licenses. It was designed to run graphical user interface applications on older PC hardware, for example, machines with 486 and early Pentium microprocessors and very little random-access memory (RAM). DSL is a Live CD with a size of 50 megabytes (MB). What originally began as an experiment to see how much software could fit in 50 MB eventually became a full Linux distribution. It can be installed on storage media with small capacities, like bootable business cards, USB flash drives, various memory cards, and Zip drives.

History 
DSL was originally conceived and maintained by John Andrews. For five years the community included Robert Shingledecker who created the MyDSL system, DSL Control Panel and other features. After issues with the main developers, Robert was, by his account, exiled from the project. He currently continues his work on Tiny Core Linux which he created in April 2008.

DSL was originally based on Model-K, a 22 MB stripped down version of Knoppix, but soon after was based on Knoppix proper, allowing much easier remastering and improvements.

System requirements 
DSL supports only x86 PCs. The minimum system requirements are a 486 processor and 8 MB of RAM. DSL has been demonstrated browsing the web with Dillo, running simple games and playing music on systems with a 486 processor and 16 MB of RAM. The system requirements are higher for running Mozilla Firefox and optional add-ons such as the OpenOffice.org office suite.

Features 
, version 4.4.10 of DSL, released November 18, 2008, was current. It includes the following software:
 Text editors: Beaver, Nano, Vim
 File managers: DFM, emelFM
 Graphics: mtPaint (raster graphics editor), xzgv (image viewer)
 Multimedia: gphone, XMMS with MPEG-1 and Video CD (VCD) support
 Office: Siag Office (spreadsheet program), Ted (word processor) with spell checker, Xpdf (viewer for Portable Document Format (PDF) documents)
 Internet:
 Web browsers: Dillo, Firefox, Netrik
 Sylpheed (E-mail client)
 naim (AOL Instant Messenger (AIM), ICQ, and IRC client)
 AxyFTP (File Transfer Protocol (FTP) client), BetaFTPD (FTP server)
 Monkey (web server)
 Server Message Block (SMB) client
 Rdesktop (Remote Desktop Protocol (RDP) client, Virtual Network Computing (VNC) viewer
 Others: Dynamic Host Configuration Protocol (DHCP) client, Secure Shell (SSH) and secure copy protocol (SCP) client and server; Point-to-Point Protocol (PPP), Point-to-Point Protocol over Ethernet (PPPoE), Asymmetric Digital Subscriber Line (ADSL) support; FUSE, Network File System (NFS), SSH Filesystem (SSHFS) support; UnionFS; generic and Ghostscript printing support; PC card, Universal Serial Bus (USB), Wi-Fi support; calculator, games, system monitor; many command-line tools

DSL has built-in scripts to download and install Advanced Packaging Tool (APT). Once APT is enabled, a user can install packages from Debian's repositories. Also, DSL hosts software ranging from large applications like OpenOffice.org and GNU Compiler Collection (GCC), to smaller ones such as aMSN, by means of the MyDSL system, which allows convenient one-click download and installing of software. Files hosted on MyDSL are called extensions. As of June 2008, the MyDSL servers were hosting over 900 applications, plugins, and other extensions.

Boot options 

Boot options are also called "cheat codes" in DSL. Automatic hardware detection may fail, or the user may want to use something other than the default settings (language, keyboard, VGA, fail safe graphics, text mode...). DSL allows the user to enter one or more cheat codes at the boot prompt. If nothing is entered, DSL will boot with the default options. Cheat codes affect many auto-detection and hardware options. Many cheat codes also affect the GUI. The list of cheat codes can be seen at boot time and also at the DSL Wiki.
You can also Run PartyDisk on DSL.

The MyDSL system 
MyDSL is handled and maintained mostly by Robert Shingledecker and hosted by many organizations, such as ibiblio and Belgium's BELNET. There are 2 areas of MyDSL: regular and testing. The regular area contains extensions that have been proven stable enough for everyday use and is broken down into different areas such as apps, net, system, and uci (Universal Compressed ISO - Extensions in .uci format are mounted as a separate file system to minimize RAM use). The testing area is for newly submitted extensions that theoretically work well enough, but may have any number of bugs.

Versions and ports

Release timeline

Flavours
The standard flavour of DSL is the Live CD. There are also other versions available:
 'Frugal' installation: DSL's 'cloop' image is installed, as a single file, to a hard disk partition. This is likely more reliable and secure than a traditional hard drive installation, since the cloop image cannot be directly modified; any changes made are only stored in memory and discarded upon rebooting.
 'dsl-version-embedded.zip': Includes QEMU for running DSL inside Windows or Linux.
 'dsl-version-initrd.iso': Integrates the normally-separate cloop image into the initrd image; this allows network booting, using PXE. As a regular toram boot, requires at least 128mb ram.
 'dsl-version-syslinux.iso': Boots using syslinux floppy image emulation instead of isolinux; for very old PCs that cannot boot with isolinux.
 'dsl-version-vmx.zip': A virtual machine hard drive image that can be run in VirtualBox, VMware Workstation or VMware Player.
 DSL-N: A larger version of DSL that exceeds the 50 MB limit of business-card CDs. DSL-N uses version 2 of the GTK+ widget toolkit and version 2.6 of the Linux kernel. The latest release of DSL-N, 0.1RC4, is 95 MB in size. It is not actively maintained.

One can also boot DSL using a boot-floppy created from one of the available floppy images ('bootfloppy.img'; 'bootfloppy-grub.img'; 'bootfloppy-usb.img'; or 'pcmciabootfloppy.img') on very old computers, where the BIOS does not support the El Torito Bootable CD Specification. The DSL kernel is loaded from the floppy disk into RAM, after which the kernel runs DSL from the CD or USB drive.

Ports and derivatives
DSL was ported to the Xbox video game console as X-DSL. X-DSL requires a modified Xbox. It can run as a Live CD or be installed to the Xbox hard drive. Users have also run X-DSL from a USB flash drive, using the USB adaptor included with Phantasy Star Online, which plugs into the memory card slot and includes one USB 1.1 port. X-DSL boots into a X11-based GUI; the Xbox controller can be used to control the mouse pointer and enter text using a virtual keyboard. X-DSL has a Fluxbox desktop, with programs for E-mail, web browsing, word processing and playing music. X-DSL can be customized by downloading extensions from the same MyDSL servers as DSL.

Linux distributions derived from Damn Small Linux include Hikarunix, used for a CD image that runs the game of Go released in 2005,
and Damn Vulnerable Linux.

Live USB 
A Live USB of Damn Small Linux can be created manually or with applications like UNetbootin. See List of tools to create Live USB systems for full list.

Status  
Due to infighting among the project's originators and main developers, DSL development seemed to be at a standstill for a long time, and the future of the project was uncertain, much to the dismay of many of the users. On July 8, 2012, John Andrews (the original developer) announced that a new release was being developed. The DSL website, including the forums which were once inaccessible, were back, as well. The first RC of the new 4.11 was released on August 3, 2012, followed by a second one on September 26.   The  damnsmalllinux.org site was inaccessible again sometime in 2015 to February 2016. As of March 27, 2016, it was again accessible for some time, but as of February 10, 2019 was inaccessible yet again.  As of 2021 it was accessible.

See also 

 Comparison of Linux distributions
 Lightweight Linux distribution
 List of Linux distributions
 List of Linux distributions that run from RAM
 Tiny Core Linux, the project Robert Shingledecker began

References

External links

 Damn Small Linux website
 USB DSL tutorial
 
 DistroWatch interview
 Archive.org's DSL ISO Archive

Reviews
 IBM developerWorks review
 OSNews review (2004), OSNews review (2011) 
 Tech Source From Bohol review
 Review of version 4.4.10 at IT Reviews

Knoppix
LiveDistro
Light-weight Linux distributions
Live USB
Debian-based distributions
Lua (programming language)-scripted software
Lightweight Unix-like systems
Linux distributions without systemd